The following lists events that happened during 2019 in New Zealand.

Incumbents

Regal and vice-regal
Head of State – Elizabeth II
Governor-General – Patsy Reddy

Government
The Sixth Labour Government, elected in 2017, continues.

Speaker of the House – Trevor Mallard
Prime Minister – Jacinda Ardern
Deputy Prime Minister – Winston Peters
Leader of the House – Chris Hipkins
Minister of Finance – Grant Robertson
Minister of Foreign Affairs – Winston Peters

Other party leaders
National – Simon Bridges (Leader of the Opposition)
New Zealand First – Winston Peters
Green  –  James Shaw and Marama Davidson
ACT – David Seymour

Judiciary
Chief Justice – Sian Elias until 13 March, then Helen Winkelmann

Main centre leaders
Mayor of Auckland – Phil Goff
Mayor of Tauranga – Greg Brownless, then from 24 October Tenby Powell
Mayor of Hamilton – Andrew King, then from 24 October Paula Southgate
Mayor of Wellington – Justin Lester, then from 30 October Andy Foster
Mayor of Christchurch – Lianne Dalziel
Mayor of Dunedin – Dave Cull, then from 25 October Aaron Hawkins

Events

February 

5 February – 6 March – Wildfires in Nelson cause thousands to evacuate their homes.

March 

15 March – Shootings at two Christchurch mosques result in the deaths of 51 people.
16 March – Sky News Australia is pulled off the air by independently-owned Sky New Zealand. The decision was made after the channel refused to stop showing graphic video footage that had been live-streamed by the Christchurch shooter at the two mosques in Christchurch.

May 

 30 May – The 2019 New Zealand budget is presented to Parliament by the Minister of Finance, Grant Robertson.

June 

3 June – The 2019 Queen's Birthday Honours are announced.

July 

 19 July – A Christchurch house destroyed in a gas explosion results in six people being hospitalised.

October 

12 October – (Postal) voting for the 2019 local elections concludes.
22 October – The Skycity Convention Centre catches fire while still under construction, causing significant disruption in the Auckland CBD.

November 

 17–23 November – Prince Charles and Camilla, Duchess of Cornwall make an official visit to Auckland, Northland, Christchurch and Kaikōura.

December 

 8 December – Severe rain causes landslides and flooding in the South Island, closing two state highways ( and ) and Inland Scenic Route 72, and trapping 1000 tourists in South Westland.
9 December – Whakaari / White Island erupts, killing 21 and injuring 26.
31 December – The 2020 New Year Honours are announced.

Sports

Cycling
 27 January – Aaron Gate wins the New Zealand Cycle Classic

Rowing
New Zealand Secondary School Championships (Maadi Cup)
 Maadi Cup (boys U18 coxed eight) – Christchurch Boys' High School
 Levin 75th Jubilee Cup (girls U18 coxed eight) – St Margaret's College
 Star Trophy (overall points) – Christchurch Boys' High School

Shooting
Ballinger Belt – 
 Jim Bailey (Australia)
 John Snowden (Ashburton), second, top New Zealander

Rugby union
 England beat the All Blacks 19–7 in the semifinal of the 2019 Rugby World Cup

Deaths

January
 1 January
 Ross Allen, local politician, cricket umpire (born 1928)
 Elizabeth Edgar, botanist (born 1929)
 11 January – Wayne Blair, cricketer (born 1948)
 18 January – Reg Hart, rugby league player (born 1936)
 20 January – Ian Shirley, academic, social justice advocate (born 1940)
 23 January – Aloysius Pang, Singaporean actor (born 1990)
 25 January – Sir John Jeffries, politician, lawyer, jurist (born 1929)
 30 January – Murray Loudon, field hockey player (born 1931)

February
 3 February – Peter Posa, guitarist (born 1941)
 6 February – John Cocks, builder, television personality (born 1966)
 9 February – Neville Young, lawyer, National Party president (born 1940)
 11 February – Allan Wild, architect, academic (born 1927)
 12 February – George Grindley, geologist (born 1925)
 14 February – Barrie Hutchinson, water polo and rugby union player (born 1926)
 18 February
 George Cawkwell, classical scholar (born 1919)
 Laura Solomon, novelist, playwright, poet (born 1974)
 Peter Wells, writer, film-maker (born 1950)
 23 February – Brian Halton, organic chemist (born 1941)
 24 February – Ian Eliason, rugby union player (born 1945)
 27 February – Bill Playle, cricketer (born 1938)

March
 1 March – Mike Tamoaieta, rugby union player (born 1995)
 2 March – Keith Davis, rugby union player (born 1930)
 3 March – Leo de Castro, musician (born )
 5 March – David Kear, geologist, science administrator (born 1923)
 7 March – Ron Russell, politician (born 1926)
 8 March – Ian Lawrence, politician, mayor of Wellington (1983–86) (born 1937)
 11 March – John Dawson, botanist (born 1928)
 14 March – Thomas Goddard, jurist (born 1937)
 15 March – Atta Elayyan, futsal player (born 1985)
 22 March – Denzil Meuli, writer, newspaper editor, Catholic priest (born 1926)
 24 March – Finn Lowery, water polo player (born 1990)
 28 March – Bill Culbert, artist (born 1935)
 30 March – Ron Elvidge, rugby union player (born 1923)

April
 4 April – Ray Harper, rugby union administrator (born 1927)
 5 April – Trevor McKee, racehorse trainer (born 1937)
 8 April – Anzac Wallace, actor (born 1943)
 9 April – George McConnell, cricketer (born 1938)
 13 April – Yvette Williams, athlete (born 1929)
 16 April – Len Hoogerbrug, architect (born 1929)
 17 April – Peter Cartwright, lawyer, viceregal consort (born 1940)
 19 April – Philip Liner, radio broadcaster (born 1925)

May
 2 May
 Duncan MacRae, rugby league player (born 1934)
 Sister Pauline O'Regan, educator, writer (born 1922)
 7 May – Te Wharehuia Milroy, Māori language academic (born 1937)
 10 May
 Carey Adamson, air force officer (born 1942)
 Malcolm Black, musician, music lawyer (born )
 11 May
 Sir Hector Busby, Māori traditional navigator and waka builder (born 1932)
 Pua Magasiva, actor (born 1980)
 15 May – Roger Blackley, art historian (born 1953)
 18 May 
 Quentin Pongia, rugby league player (born 1970)
 Doug Wilson, rugby union player (born 1931)
 24 May – Sharon McAuslan, jurist (born 1945)
 26 May – Percy Erceg, rugby union player (born 1928)
 27 May – Guy Jansen, music educator, choral musician (born 1935)
 30 May – Jim Bell, association footballer (born 1935)
 31 May – Sir Grant Hammond, jurist (born 1944)

June
 2 June – Alistair Browning, actor (born 1954)
 13 June – Merilyn Wiseman, potter (born 1941)
 18 June
 Shirlene Colcord, one of the Lawson quintuplets (born 1965).
 Bill Deacon, rugby league player (born ).
 Shona Dunlop MacTavish, dancer, choreographer (born 1920)
 21 June – Geraldine Harcourt, Japanese–English translator (born 1952)
 25 June – Arthur Candy, cyclist (born 1934)
 30 June – James Gill, cricketer (born 1928)

July
 4 July – Vernon McArley, cricketer (born 1923)
 6 July – Denis Pain, jurist, eventing team manager (born 1936)
 9 July – Heather Nicholson, geologist, writer (born 1931)
 12 July – Matthew Trundle, classics and ancient history academic (born 1965)
 15 July – Brian Coote, legal academic (born 1929)
 17 July – Warren Cole, rower (born 1940)
 19 July – Shirley Peterson, athlete (born 1928)
 20 July
 Paddy Bassett, agricultural scientist (born 1918)
 Lance Pearson, cricketer, basketball (born 1937)
 21 July – Peter Ramsay, educationalist, daffodil breeder (born 1939)
 23 July – Ruth Gotlieb, local-body politician (born 1923)
 29 July – John Wybrow, politician, diplomat (born 1928)

August
 1 August
 Raymond Boyce, stage and costume designer, puppeteer (born 1928)
 Llew Summers, sculptor (born 1947)
 2 August
 Stuart O'Connell, Roman Catholic bishop (born 1935)
 Rob Storey, politician (born 1936)
 Helen Young, radio manager, arts advocate (born 1926) 
 3 August – Sir Brian Lochore, rugby union player and coach (born 1940)
 6 August – Rod Coleman, motorcycle road racer (born 1926)
 8 August – Mazhar Krasniqi, Muslim community leader (born 1931)
 11 August – Geoff Malcolm, physical chemist (born 1931)
 15 August – Noel Pope, local-body politician (born 1931)
 16 August – Bruce Deans, rugby union player (born 1960)
 21 August – Lawrence Reade, cricketer (born 1930)
 23 August – Roaring Lion, Thoroughbred racehorse (foaled 2015)
 25 August
 Sam McGredy, rose hybridiser (born 1932).
 Ian Sinclair, cricketer (born 1933)
 26 August
 Felix Donnelly, Roman Catholic priest, social activist, writer, broadcaster (born 1929) 
 Ray Henwood, actor (born 1937)
 Pita Paraone, politician (born 1945)
 27 August – Tahu Potiki, Ngāi Tahu leader (born 1966)
 29 August – Don Aickin, obstetrician and gynaecologist (born 1934)
 30 August – Ken France, association footballer (born 1941)

September
 4 September – Peter Ellis, convicted child sex abuser (born 1958)
 7 September – Lawrie Creamer, protein chemist (born 1937)
 8 September – Ray Hitchcock, cricketer, racehorse breeder (born 1929)
 9 September – Alister Taylor, publisher (born 1943)
 12 September
 Wade Doak, marine conservationist (born 1940)
 ʻAkilisi Pōhiva, Tongan Prime Minister (born 1941)
 18 September – Lady Anne Berry, horticulturalist (born 1919)
 27 September – Jack Lasenby, children's author (born 1931)

October
 2 October – Tiny Hill, rugby union player and selector (born 1927)
 7 October – Harvey Benge, photographer (born 1944)
 10 October – Marie Darby, marine biologist (born 1940)
 11 October – Heather Robson, badminton and tennis player (born 1928)
 18 October – Rom Harré, philosopher (born 1927)
 Between 16 and 22 October – Mike McClennan, rugby league player and coach (born 1944)
 28 October – Ken McCracken, rugby league player

November
 2 November – Ian Cross, writer, journalist, broadcasting executive (born 1925)
 5 November – Ed Dolejs, softball coach (born 1929)
 9 November – Les Downes, cricketer (born 1945)
 16 November – Nancy Brunning, actress and playwright (born 1971)
 18 November
 Ryan Costello, baseball player (born 1996)
 Sandra Easterbrook, netball player (born 1946)
 20 November – Alastair Smith, information science academic (born 1948)
 21 November – Wally Clark, zoologist (born 1927)
 25 November – Bevin Hough, rugby league player, long jumper (born 1929)

December
 1 December – Sacred Falls, Thoroughbred racehorse (foaled 2009)
 3 December – Arthur Baysting, writer, songwriter, New Zealand music advocate (born 1947)
 5 December – Rick Bryant, musician (born 1948)
 6 December – Jules Mikus, convicted murderer (born 1958)
 8 December
 Joe Moodabe, cinema chain manager (born 1937)
 Tessa Temata, diplomat (born )
 12 December
 Norman Kingsbury, educational administrator (born 1932)
 Brian Muller, rugby union player (born 1942).
 Sir Peter Snell, athlete (born 1938).
 21 December
 Peter Bartlett, architect and academic (born 1929)
 Sam Strahan, rugby union player (born 1944)
 22 December – Bill Lambert, politician (born 1930)
 29 December – Ken Strongman, psychology academic, book and television reviewer (born 1940)
 31 December – Diana Martin, microbiologist (born 1942)

See also

References

 
2010s in New Zealand
Years of the 21st century in New Zealand
New Zealand
New Zealand